The 2016 Levene Gouldin & Thompson Tennis Challenger was a professional tennis tournament played on hard court. It was the 23rd edition of the tournament which was part of the 2016 ATP Challenger Tour. It took place in Binghamton, United States between 18 and 24 July 2016.

Singles main-draw entrants

Seeds

 1 Rankings are as of July 11, 2016.

Other entrants
The following players received wildcards into the singles main draw:
  Jared Hiltzik
  Thai-Son Kwiatkowski
  Michael Mmoh
  Dennis Nevolo

The following player received entry as an alternate:
  Lloyd Glasspool

The following players received entry from the qualifying draw:
  Aleksandar Vukic
  Jose Statham
  Erik Crepaldi
  Evan King

The following players received entry as lucky losers:
  Peter Kobelt
  Finn Tearney

Doubles main-draw entrants

Seeds

 1 Rankings are as of July 11, 2016.

Other entrants
The following pairs received entry as wildcards:
  Alex Lawson /  Jackson Withrow
  William Mendler /  Nick Zieziula
  Thai-Son Kwiatkowski /  Tommy Paul

The following pair received entry as qualifiers into the doubles main draw:
  Juan Manuel Benítez Chavarriaga /  Raleigh Smith

Champions

Men's singles 

  Darian King def.  Mitchell Krueger, 6–2, 6–3

Men's doubles 

  Matt Reid /  John-Patrick Smith def.  Liam Broady /  Guilherme Clezar, 6–4, 6–2

References

External links
Official Website

 
Levene Gouldin and Thompson Tennis Challenger
Levene Gouldin & Thompson Tennis Challenger
Levene
Levene Gouldin and Thompson Tennis Challenger
Levene Gouldin and Thompson Tennis Challenger